Eight Track Sound Situation is the first album by Kingston upon Hull individual band Fonda 500, released in 2000 (see 2000 in music). The album gained positive reviews and was awarded The Sunday Times 'Album of the Week'. The album was praised for its inventive sound, its harmonies, and its off-kilter approach to music. The band released an 8-bit version of this album on limited edition cassette in 2014, 8 bit sound system.

Track listing
"Introduction" 
"Interstella Invitation" 
"Dorn" 
"International Feelings of Games U Love" 
"Betamax" 
"Warming to the Warmth" 
"Ecoutez Les Grande Animaux Radio" 
"Passing Thru" 
"Matinee Slumbertime"
"Song For A Commercial"
"Pops#3"
"When We Are Together We Make No Sound Situation"
"Mac & Cheese Recall"
"Little Carnies Hi-Fi"
"Lucky Tokyo"
"The Allstar Singularity"
"Get Nearer To Me And You'll Always Be Warmed By My Flippers"
"The Spaceman Individual"
"Introduction"

External links
bandcamp

2000 albums